Quick Reaction Alert (QRA) is state of readiness and modus operandi of air defence maintained at all hours of the day by NATO air forces. The United States usually refers to Quick Reaction Alert as 'Airspace Control Alert'.

Some non-NATO countries also maintain QRA, either full-time or part-time.

Operation

QRA in the United Kingdom
Pilots and engineers on QRA duty are at immediate readiness twenty-four hours a day fully dressed in the Crew Ready Room, which are next to the hangars (a hardened aircraft shelter known informally as Q-sheds) which houses the interceptor aircraft, since 2007 the Eurofighter Typhoon. Pilots are on QRA duty around once or twice a month, each a twenty-four-hour shift. Engineers are on QRA duty three or four times a year, each for a twenty-four-hour a day shift for seven days at a time. Two Typhoon aircraft are on duty, along with a Voyager tanker  at RAF Brize Norton in Oxfordshire; before 2014 this was carried out by a TriStar.

Civilian aircraft in the UK are monitored by NATS Holdings at:
 Swanwick, Hampshire with the London Area Control Centre and London Terminal Control Centre (at RAF West Drayton until 2007), broadly known as the London Air Traffic Control Centre, which covers the London Flight Information Region (EGTT). The RAF have a team at Swanwick.
 Prestwick, which covers the Scotland Flight Information Region (EGPX) which is north of the Solway Firth.

Military radar in the UK is controlled by the UK Air Surveillance and Control System (ASACS), looked after by ASACS Force Command. It has Remote Radar Heads (RRH) at:
 RRH Benbecula in the Outer Hebrides
 RRH Saxa Vord in Shetland (AN/TPS-77 radar moved from RRH Staxton Wold)
 RRH Buchan (former Master Radar Station, or MRS, Buchan) off the A90 south of Peterhead
 RRH Brizlee Wood in Hulne Park, Northumberland (west of RAF Boulmer),  directly west of Alnwick
 RRH Staxton Wold off the B1249 in Willerby, North Yorkshire; the Yorkshire Wolds Way passes next to it
 RRH Neatishead at Trimingham on the Norfolk coast
 RRH Portreath in Cornwall

The radars were Type 93, and are being replaced by the Lockheed Martin AN/FPS-117 system.

QRA in the United States
The United States refers to Quick Reaction Alert as Airspace Control Alert.

QRA response
Air traffic across Europe is controlled by Eurocontrol in Brussels. Military aircraft from Russia can be tracked across Norway, and reported to the Norwegian Joint Headquarters near Bodø, or the Combined Air Operations Centre 2 (CAOC UE) in Uedem, North Rhine-Westphalia close to the border with the Netherlands. Combined Air Operations Centre Finderup (CAOC Finderup), in Denmark, watches Russian aircraft and can alert the UK, and has RAF staff there. Russian Air Force Tupolev Tu-95 aircraft originate from the Olenya air base on the Kola Peninsula and Tupolev Tu-160 Blackjack aircraft come from the Engels-2 base near Saratov. The Tu-95 aircraft are on 12-14 hour missions, and when tracked across Norway have been colloquially referred to with the codename of zombies.

A QRA response involves the fighter aircraft being scrambled to investigate an infringement of the NATO country's airspace or area of interest.

QRA response in the United Kingdom
This may also be a civilian aircraft that poses a threat, if not sufficiently responding to air traffic control (ATC); incidents of this nature in the UK are monitored by the Control and Reporting Centre (CRC) at RAF Boulmer, which builds a 3D Recognised Air Picture and the National Air and Space Operations Centre (NASOC) at RAF Air Command decides whether to send a QRA response. Joint Force Air Component Headquarters is also at High Wycombe.

QRA stations

Austria
Austria has only daylight QRA readiness. Austrian Air Force Air Surveillance Command is located at Salzburg, Fighter Squadron 1 & 2  with Eurofighter Typhoon on Zeltweg Air Base.

Baltic States
Lithuania, Latvia and Estonia, though members of NATO, have no fighters capable of QRA intercepts. Other NATO nations provide periodic air defence at the NATO QRA standard.

Bulgaria
Graf Ignatievo Air Base (3rd Fighter Air Base) of the BuAF has a single MiG-29 squadron, which carry two R-73 missiles. The Bulgarian CRC is at Sofia.

Croatia
The Croatian Air Force's Air Force and Air Defence Command is located in Zagreb  The 191. Fighter Squadron, flying MiG-21bisD/UMD from Pleso (Zagreb Airport) with a second QRA on Pula Airport. The MiG-21 will be replaced with Dassault Rafale.

Czech Republic
261st Control and Reporting Centre (CRC), in Hlavenec. The Czech Air Force uses JAS-39C/D Gripen at Čáslav AFB.

Denmark
The Royal Danish Air Force Command is headquartered at Karup Air Base.  The Fighter Wing with the Eskadrille 727 and the Eskadrille 730, at Skrydstrup Air Base use F-16AM/BM Falcon (soon replaced with F-35A).

Finland
The Air Operations Centre is at Jyväskylä–Tikkakoski Air Base. The Finnish Air Force Fighter Squadron 31 (Hävittäjälentolaivue 31, HävLLv 31) uses F-18C/D from  Rovaniemi, Kuopio. In addition to the Air Force's main operating bases, QRA aircraft may by rotated between civilian airports and other temporary operating bases.

Germany
The municipality of Uedem houses NATO's Combined Air Operations Centre (CAOC) Uedem. The German Air Force uses Eurofighter Typhoons from Wittmund (QRA North) and Neuburg Air Base (QRA South), with alternate QRA bases in Nörvenich and Rostock-Laage Airport.

Hungary
The Hungarian Air Command and Control Centre is in Veszprém, while the QRA base is at the Kecskemét Air Base with the Fighter Squadron Puma and operates JAS-39C/D Gripen fighters. The Hungarian Gripens are responsible for the air police service over Slovenia.

Iceland
Iceland, though a member of NATO, has no standing armed forces. Other NATO nations provide periodic air defence at the NATO QRA standard.

Italy
Italian Air Force squadrons equipped with Typhoon and F-35 jets provide QRA coverage on a rotational basis. These squadrons are based at Grosseto Air Base in Tuscany (IX Gruppo of 4º Stormo), Gioia del Colle Air Base in Apulia (10° Gruppo and 12° Gruppo of 36º Stormo), Trapani Air Base in Sicily (18° Gruppo of 37° Stormo), and Istrana Air Base in Veneto (132° Gruppo of 51° Stormo), all of them operating Typhoons. More recently the F-35As based at Amendola Air Base in Apulia (13° Gruppo of 32° Stormo) have been given QRA tasks as well, and F-35s at Ghedi Air Base in Lombardy will be on QRA too.

Netherlands
The Royal Netherlands Air Force have F-16 aircraft at Volkel Air Base or Leeuwarden Air Base on high alert. They intercept once notified by the Air Operations Control Station Nieuw-Milligen, near Apeldoorn in Gelderland. The Royal Netherlands Air Force shares the responsibilities for QRA above Benelux with the Belgian Air Component since 2016/2017.

Norway
The Royal Norwegian Air Force Quick Reaction Alert force consists of F-35 and F-16 squadrons on high alert from Bodø Air Station and Ørland Air Station, among others.

Romania
The RoAF 71st Air Base (Baza 71 Aeriană) at Câmpia Turzii in central Romania and the RoAF 86th Air Base (Baza 86 Aeriană) at Borcea in south-east Romania. Romania operates MiG-21 LanceRs, which carry the Matra Magic 2 missile and F-16 Fighting Falcons, which carry AIM-9X and AIM-120C missiles. The Romanian CRC is at Balotești in southern Romania.

Slovakia
The Air Force Command of the Slovak Air Force is in Zvolen, the  1st Tactical Squadron, with MiG-29AS, 2× MiG-29UBS at Sliač Air Base. The MiG-29 wil be replaced with F-16V.

Spain
At the Morón Air Base at Morón de la Frontera in the Province of Seville in the south of Spain, Ala 11 (11th Wing) has three squadrons of Typhoons, with 111 Sqn and 112 Sqn. Los Llanos Air Base has 141 Sqn and 142 Sqn of Ala 14.

Switzerland
The main base for the QRA of the Swiss Air Force is Payerne Air Base. The QRA also operates from Emmen Air Base and Meiringen Air Base for several weeks per year. Zurich Airport, Geneva Airport and Sion Airport serve as alternative locations. All QRA operations are guided by the  Operations Center (EZ-LUV)/CRC at Dübendorf Air Base. The Swiss QRA are equipped with F/A-18C/D.

Turkey
Merzifon Air Base of the TuAF (Türk Hava Kuvvetleri), in northern Turkey, has two F-16 squadrons (built by TAI) with the 5th Air Wing (5 Ana Jet Üs). Bandırma Air Base has two F-16 squadrons of the 6th Air Wing. The Turkish CRC is at Ahlatlabel near Ankara.

United Kingdom
Currently there are two QRA RAF stations, of 1 Group.
 RAF Coningsby in Lincolnshire looks after the southern sector of the UK, known as QRA South, with 3 and 11 (XI) squadrons.
 RAF Lossiemouth in Moray protects the northern sector of the UK, referred to as QRA North, hosted by 1 Sqn, No. 2 Squadron RAF  and 6 Sqn.

History
Quick Reaction Alert is the current development from scrambling by RAF Fighter Command in the Battle of Britain.

Germany
RAF Wildenrath provided air defence cover for Royal Air Force Germany (RAFG), which flew Phantoms with 92 Sqn and 19 Sqn until 1991.

Italy
The first country to put the Typhoon onto QRA duty was Italy on 16 December 2005, by IX Gruppo of 4º Stormo; 12° Gruppo of 36º Stormo followed on 1 July 2007 and 10° Gruppo on 1 July 2010. Typhoons replaced the F-16A/ADF of 37° Stormo at Trapani from May 2012. From 1 March 2018 the F-35 of 32° Stormo based in Amendola, has implemented the QRA assets.

Spain
111 Sqn put the first Typhoon on QRA duty in July 2008, followed by 142 Sqn of Ala 14, and later 141 Sqn.

United Kingdom

In the 1950s and 1960s, training as a fighter controller in the UK was at MRS Bawdsey (RAF Bawdsey); the main central control was known as ADOC (similar to the USA's and Canada's NORAD at Peterson Air Force Base) which monitored the UK Air Defence Region (UK ADR). The ROTOR system was developed in the 1950s. Before computers arrived in the 1970s, the Russian aircraft were plotted on a map, mainly by WRAF personnel. 11 Group (at RAF Bentley Priory from 1968 and RAF High Wycombe from 1972) looked after the UK's air defence until the 1990s; High Wycombe today has the European Air Group.

Every QRA alert required a Victor tanker from RAF Marham in Norfolk, with the codename Dragonfly. One fighter squadron would be on QRA for six month shifts. The Phantom had much better range than the Lightning, and had far-better look down radar, but the Lightning had better performance. The RAF Phantom variant had Spey engines, which were not intentionally designed for the aircraft, and gave lower performance; it had an advanced jam-resistant inertial navigation system but the RAF Phantoms could not take off immediately as this inertial system had to align first. The Lightning left service in 1988 and the Phantom in 1992. Only when the Tornado F.3 arrived did RAF QRA duty have an aircraft that had complete night-vision capabilities and could connect to the Sentry aircraft.

In the 1960s, Southern Q was maintained by the Lightnings of 5 Sqn at RAF Binbrook and those of 29 Sqn and 111 Squadron at RAF Wattisham. Southern Q was rotated around the three RAF bases. RAF Leeming took over Southern Q from RAF Coningsby in 1988. 11 Sqn left RAF Leeming in October 2005, then on 29 June 2007, 3 Sqn at RAF Coningsby took over Southern Q from the Tornados of 25 Sqn at RAF Leeming in North Yorkshire, with the Typhoons of 3 Sqn having their first scramble on 17 August 2007 when they intercepted a Russian Bear; 3 Sqn took over all of Southern Q from 1 April 2008. In August 2007 the Russians had begun to launch long-distance patrols after a 15-year hiatus. Typhoons arrived at RAF Leuchars with 6 Sqn from 6 September 2010, performing their first QRA scramble on 2 January 2011, with Typhoons joining 1 Sqn from 15 September 2012. 6 Sqn moved to Lossiemouth in June 2014, with 1 Sqn moving in August 2014. QRA North was moved from RAF Leuchars to RAF Lossiemouth on 1 September 2014. The first QRA sortie from Lossiemouth was on 19 September 2014 with 6 Sqn.

2012 Olympics
To cover the security for the 2012 Summer Olympics, part of QRA South was briefly deployed from RAF Coningsby to operate from RAF Northolt.

See also
 ACCS
 Baltic Air Policing
 Cold War II
 NATO Integrated Air Defense System (NADGE, or NATO Air Defence Ground Environment, in the 1950s)
 :Category:Military radars of the United Kingdom
 :Category:Telecommunications equipment of the Cold War
 :Category:Soviet Long Range Aviation bases

References

External links

 September 2012 MoD document
 

Air traffic control in Europe
Aircraft operations
Anti-aircraft warfare
Aviation in Europe
Cold War
History of the Royal Air Force
History of Fife
History of Moray
Military history of Lincolnshire
Military history of Northumberland
Military history of Suffolk
Royal Air Force deployments